This table displays the top-rated primetime television series of the 1988–89 season as measured by Nielsen Media Research.

References

1988 in American television
1989 in American television
1988-related lists
1989-related lists
Lists of American television series